The Sepik-Ramu shrikethrush (Colluricincla tappenbecki) is a species of bird in the family Pachycephalidae.

Taxonomy and systematics
This species was formerly considered a conspecific member of the little shrikethrush complex. Genetic investigations of New Guinea populations of the little shrikethrush indicate high levels of genetic divergence, suggesting it comprised more than one species.

Subspecies
Currently, three subspecies are recognized:
 C. t. tappenbecki - Reichenow, 1898: Originally described as a separate species. Found in north-central New Guinea to Astrolabe Bay (north-eastern New Guinea)
 C. t. madaraszi - (Rothschild & Hartert, 1903): Found on Huon Peninsula, New Guinea
 C. t. maeandrina - (Stresemann, 1921): Found in east-central New Guinea

Distribution and habitat
It is found in New Guinea. Its natural habitats are subtropical or tropical moist lowland forests and subtropical or tropical moist montane forests.

References

Sepik-Ramu shrikethrush
Birds of New Guinea
Sepik-Ramu shrikethrush
Sepik-Ramu shrikethrush